Glyphidocera reparabilis is a moth in the family Autostichidae. It was described by Walsingham in 1911. It is found in Panama.

The Glyphidocera reparabilis' wingspan is 9–10 mm. Its forewings are pale fawn, but so profusely sprinkled with brownish fuscous that the paler ground-colour is almost entirely
obliterated. The discal spots on its wings are perceptible, one is near the base, one, larger, before the middle, and one at the end of the cell, all dark fuscous. The hindwings are pale brownish grey, with no considerable thickening near the flexus.

References

Moths described in 1911
Glyphidocerinae